The Men's slalom competition of the Sarajevo 1984 Olympics was held at Bjelašnica.

The defending world champion was Ingemar Stenmark of Sweden, who was also the defending World Cup slalom champion and the leader of the 1984 World Cup.

Results

References 

Men's slalom